Final Battle 2013 was the 12th Final Battle professional wrestling event produced by Ring of Honor (ROH), which occurred on December 14, 2013 at the Hammerstein Ballroom in Manhattan, New York.

Background
Final Battle 2013 featured eight professional wrestling matches, which involved different wrestlers from pre-existing scripted feuds, plots, and storylines that played out on ROH's television programs. Wrestlers portrayed villains or heroes as they followed a series of events that built tension and culminated in a wrestling match or series of matches.

Results

See also
List of Ring of Honor pay-per-view events

References

External links
Ring of Honor's official website

2013 in professional wrestling
2013 in New York City
2013
Professional wrestling in New York City
Events in New York City
December 2013 events in the United States